UCMC may refer to:

Ukraine Crisis Media Center
University of Calgary Medical Clinic
University of Chicago Medical Center
University of Cincinnati Medical Center

See also
NUCMC
Ucamco